The Robidoux School is a historic school building located at 201 South 10th in St. Joseph, Missouri. It was the first building used by what would become Missouri Western State University. The first high school in St. Joseph was built on the site in 1866.  In 1895 the high school moved to 13th and Patee and the building was remodeled to be a grammar school named after St. Joseph founder Joseph Robidoux. In 1907 the building was razed and architect Edmond Jacques Eckel and Walter Boschen was commissioned to design the new Classical Revival style building which opened in 1909 at a cost of $130,000 including contents.  It included 12 classrooms and an auditorium seating 1,100. In 1914, the building was used as a freshman annex for Central High School (Saint Joseph, Missouri). In 1919 it became the Robidoux Polytechnic High School, a vocational trade school. In 1933 it became home for the St. Joseph Junior College which had been founded in 1915 and was earlier operating out of Central High School.  The move occurred at the same time as the Central High School moved to its current location. In 1965 the Junior College became a four-year Missouri Western State College.  In 1969 the college moved to its current location on the east side of St. Joseph.

In 1981 the building was added to the National Register of Historic Places.  Ironically the application was filed by Missouri Western's rival Northwest Missouri State University.  It is located in the Museum Hill Historic District.

References

Individually listed contributing properties to historic districts on the National Register in Missouri
Missouri Western State University
School buildings on the National Register of Historic Places in Missouri
Neoclassical architecture in Missouri
School buildings completed in 1908
Buildings and structures in St. Joseph, Missouri
Schools in Buchanan County, Missouri
National Register of Historic Places in Buchanan County, Missouri
1908 establishments in Missouri